Pselaphus is a genus of ant-loving beetles in the family Staphylinidae. There are at least 20 described species in Pselaphus.

Species
These 20 species belong to the genus Pselaphus:

 Pselaphus acuminatus Motschulsky, 1835
 Pselaphus bellax Casey, 1894
 Pselaphus bulbifer Reichenbach, 1816
 Pselaphus caucasicus Motschulsky, 1845
 Pselaphus erichsoni LeConte, 1840
 Pselaphus fustifer Casey, 1894
 Pselaphus heisei Herbst, 1791
 Pselaphus lomnickii (Reitter, 1901)
 Pselaphus longiclavus LeConte, 1849
 Pselaphus minyops Wollaston, 1871
 Pselaphus mundus Sharp, 1874
 Pselaphus parvus Karaman, 1940
 Pselaphus pauper Sharp, 1874
 Pselaphus salonitanus Karaman, 1940
 Pselaphus securiger Reichenbach, 1816
 Pselaphus skopljensis Karaman
 Pselaphus tenuis Sharp, 1874
 Pselaphus treskanus Karaman
 Pselaphus turkestanicus Karaman
 Pselaphus ventralis Broun, 1895

References

Further reading

External links

 

Pselaphitae
Articles created by Qbugbot